The United Nations Independent Expert on the Promotion of a Democratic and Equitable International Order is a United Nations Independent Expert (also known as Special Rapporteur) appointed by the United Nations Human Rights Council under its special procedures mechanism, to report on the thematic field of the promotion of a democratic and equitable international order. The mandate was established by Human Rights Council resolution 18/6 (29 September 2011), chiefly supported by developing countries.

On 23 March 2012, Alfred-Maurice de Zayas (United States) was elected the Independent Expert by the Human Rights Council, after being nominated by its President Laura Dupuy Lasserre, the Permanent Representative of Uruguay. The other nominated candidates were Miloon Kothari (India), Vugar Mammadov (Azerbaijan) and Jean Ziegler (Switzerland). De Zayas presented his first report to the UN Human Rights Council at its 21st session in September 2012, calling for uniform application of international law.  He presented his interim report to the General Assembly on 2 November 2012  and will present his new report to the council during the 24th session in September 2013.

References

External links 

 Independent Expert on international order

International relations